Raja Sansi Assembly constituency (Sl. No.: 12) is a Punjab Legislative Assembly constituency that includes Rajasansi in Amritsar district, Punjab state, India.

Members of the Legislative Assembly

Election results

2022

2017

2012

See also
 List of constituencies of the Punjab Legislative Assembly
 Amritsar district

References

External links
 

Assembly constituencies of Punjab, India
Amritsar district